Francisco Espoz Ilundáin (17 June 1781 – 24 December 1836), better known as Francisco Espoz y Mina, was a Spanish guerrilla leader and general.

Biography
He was born in Idocin in Navarre. His father, Juan Esteban Espoz y Mina, and his mother, Maria Teresa Hundain y Ardaiz, belonged to the class of yeomen, rural smallholders. Mina worked on the small family farm until 1808. When Napoleon endeavoured to seize Spain in that year, Mina enlisted in the Doyle regiment, and then entered the guerrilla group commanded by his nephew Francisco Javier Mina. When Javier was captured by the French on 21 March 1810, seven men of the group chose to follow Francisco, and on 1 April 1810 the Junta of Aragon gave him the command of the guerrilleros of Navarre.

His first act was to arrest and shoot at Estella a certain Echevarria, who, under pretence of being a guerrillero, was in fact a brigand. The national government in Cadiz gave him rank, and by 7 September 1812 he had been promoted to the rank of commander-in-chief in Upper Aragon, on the left bank of the Ebro. In the interval he claimed that he had fought 143 actions big and little, had been repeatedly wounded by bullet, sword and lance, had taken 13 fortified posts, and 14,000 prisoners, and had never been surprised by the French.

Though some maintain that he was not at his best as a leader in battle, as a strategist Espoz y Mina was very successful and displayed great organizing capacity. The French authorities were compelled to allow him to levy customs dues on all goods imported into Spain, except contraband of war, which he would not allow to pass without fighting. The money thus obtained was used to pay his bands a regular salary. He was able to avoid levying excessive contributions on the country and to maintain discipline among his men, whom he had brought to a respectable state of efficiency in 1812. Espoz y Mina claimed that he immobilized 26,000 French troops which would, but for him, have served with Marshal Marmont at Salamanca. In the campaign of 1813 and 1814 he served with distinction under Field marshal Wellesley, the future Duke of Wellington.

After the restoration of Ferdinand VII he fell into disfavour. On 25/26 September he attempted to bring about an uprising at Pamplona in favor of the Liberal party, but failed, and went into exile. His political opinions were democratic and radical, and as a yeoman he disliked the hidalgos (low-ranking nobles). The Revolution of 1820 brought him back, and he served the Liberal party during the Trienio Liberal in Galicia, Leon and Catalonia. In this last district he made the only vigorous resistance to the French intervention in favor of Ferdinand VII. On 1 November 1823 he capitulated, and the French allowed him to escape to England by sea. In 1830 he took part in an unsuccessful rising against Ferdinand.

On the death of the king he was recalled to Spain, and the government of the regent Christina gave him the command against the Carlists in 1835, though they feared his Radicalism. By this time, years, exposure and wounds had undermined his health. He was also opposed to Tomás de Zumalacárregui, an old officer of his in the War of Independence, and an even greater master of irregular mountain warfare. His health compelled him to resign in April 1835, and his later command in Catalonia was only memorable for the part he took in forcing the regent to grant a constitution in August 1836. He died at Barcelona on 24 December 1836.

In 1825 Espoz y Mina published A Short Extract from the Life of General Mina, in Spanish and English, in London. Mention is made of him in all histories of the affairs of Spain during the first third of the 19th century. His full Memoirs were published by his widow at Madrid in 1851–52.

The Plaza de Mina in Cadiz, Spain is named after him.

References

Notes

Sources

1781 births
1836 deaths
Politicians from Navarre
Progressive Party (Spain) politicians
Spanish generals
Spanish commanders of the Napoleonic Wars
People of the Peninsular War
Military personnel of the First Carlist War
Spanish guerrillas